Keeneyville School District 20 (KSD20) is an elementary school district headquartered in Hanover Park, Illinois. The district has three schools.  it had over 100 teachers and professional employees as well as over 1,500 students. The district serves the Keeneyville unincorporated area and sections of Hanover Park, Bloomingdale, and Roselle.

History
It was originally known as the Lake Street School District 20 and was established in Bloomingdale on October 4, 1887, with a one-room schoolhouse. It initially had one teacher and nine students between the ages of 5 and 12. In 1914 Lake Street School received its first multi-room building. The first recorded instance of the school having a second teacher was in 1941. There were 35 students in 1949 and about 100 by 1964.

By 1950 the district received its current name; its namesake is real estate developer Albert F. Keeney (1872-1950), who originated from Iowa and subdivided several area plots in 1932. He and his family donated money and signage to the Lake Street School.

In 1951 the district installed a gymnasium and an additional classroom at the Lake Street School, and in 1965 four extra classrooms, additional restrooms, a storage room, a boiler, and a teacher lounge were added. The Lake Street School was later replaced by newer facilities and was eventually demolished.

Schools

The schools include: Spring Wood Middle School in Hanover Park, Greenbrook Elementary School in Hanover Park, Waterbury Elementary School in Roselle, and Early Childhood Center in Hanover Park.

References

External links
 
School districts in DuPage County, Illinois
Bloomingdale, Illinois
Hanover Park, Illinois
Roselle, Illinois
1897 establishments in Illinois
School districts established in 1897